is a district located in Miyazaki Prefecture, Japan.

As of the Miyakonojō merger (but with the population statistics as of October 2020), the district has an estimated population of 25,591 and a density of 232.6 persons per km2. The total area is 110.0 km2.

Towns and villages
 Mimata

Mergers
 On January 1, 2006 the towns of Takajō, Takazaki, Yamada, and Yamanokuchi merged into the expanded city of Miyakonojō.

References

Districts in Miyazaki Prefecture